= Permian Building =

Coordinates: 31.9982°N 102.0778°W

- Interactive map of the Permian Building area

General information
- Status: Demolished
- Type: Office space
- Location: Midland, TX
- Completed: 1933
- Opening: 1933
- Destroyed: 2007

Height
- Roof: 68 feet (21 m)
- Top floor: 6

Technical details
- Floor count: 6

The Permian Building was a large office building in Midland, Texas that stood at 68 feet (21 m). It was built in 1933 and demolished in 2007. According to the Midland Convention and Visitor's Bureau, former US President George W. Bush had an office in the building in the late 1970s.
